José Barreiro (born in Cuba in 1948) is an American novelist, journalist and activist.  He is recognized as an advocate of Native community self-determination and autochthonous development (indigeneity).  Barreiro is an elder and advisor in the Nación Taina.

Work with Smithsonian Institution
Barreiro is Smithsonian Scholar Emeritus, and guides various community projects and publications. He served as assistant director for history and culture research and directed the Office for Latin America, at the Smithsonian National Museum of the American Indian from 2006 to 2017.  Barreiro was an early editor and contributor at Akwesasne Notes (1976–1984), during the years of Seneca luminary John Mohawk. At Akwesasne Notes, Barreiro led the human rights group, Emergency Response International Network. Later, he and Mohawk founded the Indigenous Peoples Network. Barreiro was an early organizer and communicator in the movement to introduce Western Hemisphere American Indigenous peoples and issues to United Nations.

	Dr. Barreiro supported the transformative potentials of the creation of the Smithsonian National Museum of the American Indian. His association with NMAI dates to the early 1980s and the museum's incipient years. In 1994, on the occasion of the opening of the Heye Center in New York, he worked with the museum to produce Native American Expressive Culture as a special edition of the Akwe:kon Journal. Dr. Barreiro's other significant publications include the award-winning novel The Indian Chronicles (1993, republished as Taino, in 2012) and scholarly books  and compendiums such  as View from the Shore: American Indian Perspectives on the Columbus Quincentenary (1990), Indian Roots of American Democracy (1992), Chiapas: Challenging History (1994), Panchito: Cacique de Montaña (2001); America Is Indian Country (2005), which he edited with Tim Johnson; Thinking in Indian: A John Mohawk Reader (2010) and Taíno: the Indian Chronicles, a novel, (2012); most recently, The Great Inka Road: Engineering an Empire, 2015, and; Dreaming Mother Earth: The Life and Wisdom of Native Cuban Cacique, Francisco "Panchito" Ramirez, Cuban Cacique, 2018.

	In Central and South America, Barreiro presently advises and advocates for indigenous or originario communities in Cuba (guajiro-taino), Guatemala (Maya-Q'eqchi') and Peru (Quechua – high mountain). In Cuba and the Caribbean, his current work sustains an increasingly accepted twenty-year campaign for the recognition for his own indigenous people (eastern plains and mountains), after centuries of marginalization and quasi-legal, historical dictums of extinction. The initiative harnessed Native community leaders with historians, anthropologists, archeologists, botanists, agriculturalists and others to reassess the historical notion of Native extinction and the obscured realities of surviving populations. An emerging local Native women's leadership and a fuller discussion on the applications of local, natural (organic) agro-ecological knowledge in Cuba, and by extension, other Caribbean countries where indigeneity is now an organizing factor.

In North America, Barreiro is involved in the application of principles of indigeneity in Native community education and socialization, particularly around the work of healing and strengthening of young people and families. Barreiro: "The emergence of a heartfelt mandate toward family healing processes in Native North American communities is an increasingly detectable movement that couples traditional principles of practice and the most current medical research in the search in developing new approaches and structures for the health of humans and the natural world."

Barreiro has two current Smithsonian exhibitions active: in New York, "Taino: Native Heritage and Identity in the Caribbean," (closed in 2019; now a SITES traveling exhibit) and, in Washington, D.C.; "The Great Inka Road: Engineering an Empire" (open).  Both explore survival and continuities of American Indigenous peoples. They both evolved as platform for development and communications initiatives with Cuban Taino-descendant communities and among Quechua communities in Peru.

Among recognized activist-scholars of American Indian policy and the contemporary Native experience, Barreiro is a pioneering figure in Native American journalism and publishing. He co-edited (with John Mohawk) the national Native journal, Akwesasne Notes from 1975-1984, and developed subsequent prominent indigenous-themed publications and communications projects. The "Notes" was a major hub of indigenous consciousness movement, involved in publishing, lecturing and organizing for human and civil rights of indigenous peoples. Based in United States Indian Country, the communications effort created many channels among Native communities in North, Central and South America. Barreiro was an early participant in the international process of indigenous peoples and a coordinator of the 1977 United Nations Conference that brought together indigenous peoples of North, Central, and South America, and the Caribbean.

Work at Cornell University
Former professor of Native American Studies at Cornell University. At Cornell, Barreiro was founding editor of Native Americas Journal (1995–2002). In 2003–2006, he redesigned and was Senior editor of Indian Country Today. He is also the editor of Indian Roots of American Democracy (1988), and the Cornell Akwe:kon series that included "Indian Corn of the Americas: Gift to the World," (1988) and "Chiapas: Challenging History," (1994). A book published in Cuba in 2001, the ethnographical testimony Panchito: Mountain Cacique, (Ediciones Catedral, Santiago de Cuba) is the first modern ethnography of a contemporary Taino-Guajiro community, and its leader. Barreiro's first novel, published in 1993 (republished 2012, Fulcrum Publishers) Taino: the Indian Chronicles, is presented as a pseudo-journal of the life of historical Diego Colon, a 12-year-old Taino whom Christopher Columbus takes with him to Spain in 1493, and who later returns to the Americas, where he supports the Taino resistance led by Guarocuya. A 2006 book of journalistic essays, America is Indian Country,  based on editorials and commentaries from the publication, Indian Country Today, canvasses contemporary issues and personalities in Indian Country. Barreiro most recently edited the book, Thinking in Indian: A John Mohawk Reader, (Fulcrum, 2010).

Marriage and children 
Barreiro married Katsi Cook, Mohawk Native American midwife, environmentalist, Native American rights activist, and women's health advocate in the early 1970s. They have five children and eight grandchildren.

Works
Taino: A Novel

See also
 Cuban American literature
 List of Cuban-American writers

Notes

References
Kratzert, M. "Native American Literature: Expanding the Canon", Collection Building Vol. 17, 1, 1998, p. 4.

1948 births
Living people
American writers of Cuban descent
20th-century Cuban writers
21st-century Cuban writers
Cornell University faculty
Cuban male novelists
Cuban non-fiction writers
Cuban people of Taíno descent
Male non-fiction writers